The Museum of Oxford (MOX) is a history museum in Oxford, England, covering the history of the City and its people. The museum includes both permanent and temporary displays featuring artefacts relating to Oxford's history from prehistoric times to the present day. The museum also acts as a public meeting space which people and organisations rent for both public and private events. Other activities facilitated by the museum include frequent public talks by historians and local cultural organisations, organised school tours, family activities, adult learning workshops, and an older people's program. 

The museum contains a gift shop stocked with items related to Oxford's history and cultural heritage, including books, toys, food, clothing, postcards. 

The museum is situated in Oxford city centre, located inside Oxford Town Hall on St Aldate's Street.

History of the museum 
The Museum of Oxford was first opened in 1975 inside Oxford Town Hall, occupying the former premises of the Oxford Public Library. The museum is situated inside Oxford Town Hall, which was first opened in 1897 and was built by the architect Henry Hare in the Jacobethan style.  

In 2005 the museum was awarded a financial grant by the Big Lottery funding scheme, Home Front Recall. This project aimed to collect and preserve memories of the Second World War from residents in Oxfordshire to commemorate the 60th anniversary of the war's end.  

In 2009 Oxford City Council considered closing the Museum of Oxford to save money, as the upkeep of the museum was costing £200,000 annually. However the closure of the museum was opposed by the Oxford Civic Society, who campaigned for its continuation and helped the museum organise a rota of volunteers to keep the museum running on a reduced cost.  

In 2018 the museum acted as a temporary home to archaeological artifacts uncovered during the construction of Oxford's Westgate Shopping Centre.

Refurbishment - 2018-2021 
From July 2018 to October 2021 the museum closed for a refurbishment which tripled the size of the museum space. The estimated cost of the refurbishment was 3.2 million, but was completed with a budget of 2.8 million by the architectural firm Purcell, and was funded by Arts Council England, the National Lottery Heritage Fund, and Oxford City Council. The refurbishment raised the number of exhibits from 286 to around 750. In 2020 Oxford City Council leader Susan Brown suggested that Oriel College's infamous statue of Cecil Rhodes could be relocated to the Museum of Oxford.  During this time which encompassed the COVID-19 pandemic, the museum begun focusing more heavily on online material and temporary displays were erected in other rooms also located inside Oxford Town Hall.

Expansion - 2021-present 
Since the 2021 October reopening the museum has relied upon a large network of over 100 volunteers. The museum also begun hosting a series of workshops for school children to teach them about local history. Also in 2021 the museum won a National Lottery grant of £240,000 for its Hidden Histories project.In 2022 the museum hosted a Digital Artist in Residence to create digital artworks featuring Oxfordshire's folklore and legends. The end result was an interactive videogame exploring pre-Christian British mythology.

Themes 
The Museum of Oxford focuses solely on the history and culture of the City of Oxford, with a focus on the people of the city who are residents rather than the University of Oxford. Such themes included within the displays include football, women's rights, policing, entertainment, engineering, social history, Jewish and Christian history, archaeology, and British military history. 

In recent years there has been a shift towards creating more displays featuring Black British history and LGBTIQA+ history. In 2021 following the refurbishments the Museum of Oxford had unveiled a temporary Windrush display celebrating the history of Caribbean people in Oxford since the 1950s.

Key exhibits 

Some of the museum's most notable items and exhibits include: 
 Oliver Cromwell's death mask
 Artefacts from Oxford's Jewish quarter
 Oxford's city crest, gifted by Elizabeth I
 A chunk of the infamous Cutteslowe Wall
 Cold War artefacts for measuring nuclear fallout
 Tickets from The Rolling Stones concert in Oxford
 A copy of Pink Newspaper, Oxford's first LGBT newspaper
 Personal possessions of Lewis Carroll, author of Alice's Adventures in Wonderland
 Personal possessions of Alice Liddell, the inspiration for Alice of Alice's Adventures in Wonderland
 A tin of Frank Coopers Marmalade which was taken on Robert Falcon Scott's ill-fated journey to the South Pole

Temporary and online exhibits 
Alongside permanent displays, the Museum of Oxford has hosted a number of temporary exhibits. Past examples have included Of Ordinary Things featuring art by Iraqi women living in Oxford, and Queering Spires which won the National Lottery's 'Sustainable Project of the Year Award'. 

One of the most common activities facilitated by the museum are memory collecting events where local people are encouraged to visit the museum to share items, photographs, and memories of their lives in Oxford. One such event was the Sporting Oxford Collecting Day in 2019 which encouraged residents to share memories of sports in Oxford. The museum also hosts occasional online displays, one of which was a project called City Stories in 2022 which sought to collect and preserve oral histories and photographs from the city's residents.  

The museum also hosts temporary events parallel to wider Oxford celebrations, such as facilitating an arts and crafts workshop called Queenly Crafts as a part of Oxford's annual Alice Day celebrations.

Gallery

Accessibility 
Every room within the Museum of Oxford is wheelchair accessible. This includes a lift to access both galleries and areas which are not ordinarily open to the public. However the steps in front of the main entrance to Oxford city hall are not wheelchair accessible, and disabled visitors will need to enter via an alternative entrance. Most display cases are designed so that they can be viewed from wheelchair height.  

Admission to the museum is free and the galleries are open every day except Sundays and holidays.

Rented spaces 
The basement areas of the Museum of Oxford hold two meeting halls which the museum rents for both public and private events. The largest room is called the Museum Makers Space, the smallest is called the Learning Studio. Also available is a kitchenette, museum props, Wi-Fi, furniture, baby changing areas, gender neutral toilets, and on-site catering. Museum spaces are also rented for filming and photographic locations.

See Also 

 Soldiers of Oxfordshire Museum
 Pitt Rivers Museum
 Ashmolean Museum
 Abingdon County Hall Museum
 Vale and Downland Museum

References

External links 
 Museum of Oxford website
 Virtual Tour of Museum of Oxford

Museum of Oxford
Museums established in 1975
Museums in Oxford
Oxford
Local museums in Oxfordshire
Museum of Oxford

History museums